The 1982 Stowe Grand Prix was a men's tennis tournament played on outdoor hard courts at the Topnotch Inn in Stowe, Vermont in the United States that was part of the 1982 Grand Prix circuit. It was the fifth edition of the tournament and was held from August 17 through August 22, 1982. Unseeded Jay Lapidus won the singles title.

Finals

Singles
 Jay Lapidus defeated  Eric Fromm 6–4, 6–2
 It was Lapidus' only singles title of his career.

Doubles
 Andy Andrews /  John Sadri defeated  Eric Fromm/  Mike Fishbach 6–3, 6–4

References

Stowe Grand Prix
Stowe Grand Prix